Canisius Thekkekara was a Syrian Catholic (Syro-Malabar Catholic) priest from Carmelites of Mary Immaculate in Kerala in Thrissur. He was declared as Servant of God by Mar Poly Kannookadan, the Bishop of Syro-Malabar Catholic Diocese of Irinjalakuda.

References

1914 births
1998 deaths
Malayali people
Eastern Catholic Servants of God
Syro-Malabar priests
Christian clergy from Thrissur
Archdiocese of Thrissur
20th-century venerated Christians